The Arriflex 35BL is a 35mm motion picture camera released by ARRI in 1972.

Function
The Arriflex 35BL was the first silent 35mm camera (BL stands for blimped). It uses a fixed butterfly reflex shutter, which gave the cinematographer an exact representation of the recorded frame. It recorded up to 100 frames per second, which was revolutionary in documenting sporting events. It uses a dual registration pin system. It also has an odometer-styled analogue footage counter. The camera uses both  and  magazines.

History
The development of the 35BL began in 1966, since there was no handholdable, silent, reflex 35 mm camera at that time. The release of this camera, together with the Panaflex Lightweight released in 1975, changed the filmmaking process profoundly and made big camera setups like the Mitchell BNCR obsolete. 
The Arriflex 35BL was released just in time to document the 1972 Summer Olympics, in Arri's hometown Munich. This led to a huge boost in popularity of this camera. It was also one of Arri's longest running product lines, being produced from 1972 till 1990, when the Arriflex 535 took over.

Models

Arriflex 35BL I
 released in 1972
 up to 100 fps
 Arri bayonet lens mount
 external blimps for certain lenses, like the Zeiss Super Speed Primes

Arriflex 35BL II
 released in 1975, alongside the Arriflex 16SR
 only up to 50 fps, new motor with higher torque, overall more silent

Arriflex 35BL III

 released in 1980
 uses the new acoustic isolated PL Mount, which made lens blimps obsolete
 new 180° half moon shutter replaced the bowtie shutter, Shutter can be manually adjusted
 similar eyepiece to the one used in the Arri 35 III is installed

Arriflex 35BL 4
 released in 1986
 new viewfinder system, brighter image in the eyepiece, Arriglow is introduced, which illuminates the frame lines, to make framing of dark scenes easier.
 only up to 40 fps, but sound level reduction to 22 dBA.

Arriflex 35BL 4S
 released in 1988
 new film movement block, even quieter operating noise
 discontinued in 1990 with the release of the Arriflex 535

References

External links
 https://tfma.temple.edu/sites/tfma/files/site-pdfs/35BLManual_ADA.pdf (Manual)
 https://shotonwhat.com/cameras/arriflex-35-bl-camera (list of movies shot on the 35 BL)

Movie cameras